Sten-Olof Carlström (18 January 1942) is a Swedish orienteering competitor. He was a member of the men's Swedish relay team that won the World Orienteering Championships in Linköping in 1968, together with Sture Björk, Karl Johansson and Göran Öhlund.

References

1942 births
Living people
Swedish orienteers
Male orienteers
Foot orienteers
World Orienteering Championships medalists
20th-century Swedish people